Hong Kong comprises the Kowloon Peninsula and 263 islands over , the largest being Lantau Island and the second largest being Hong Kong Island. Ap Lei Chau is one of the most densely populated islands in the world.

Hong Kong Island is historically the political and commercial centre of Hong Kong. It was the site of the initial settlement of Victoria City, where the financial district of Central is now located. Most of the other islands are commonly referred to as the Outlying Islands.

The Kowloon Peninsula, across Victoria Harbour from Hong Kong Island is another notable commercial centre in Hong Kong.

In terms of the districts of Hong Kong, while one of the 18 districts is called the Islands District, many islands of Hong Kong are actually not part of that district, which only consists of some twenty large and small islands in the southern and the south-western waters of Hong Kong. These islands belong to respective districts depending on their locations.

Peninsulas
Below is a partial list of the peninsulas of Hong Kong and the districts they belong to:

Mainland
 Clear Water Bay Peninsula
 Fu Tau Sha Peninsula
 Kowloon Peninsula – Geographically, it refers to the area south of the mountain ranges of Beacon Hill, Lion Rock, Tate's Cairn, Kowloon Peak, etc. and covers five districts itself. Historically, only the portion south of Boundary Street was ceded to Britain by the Convention of Peking in 1860, covering the area of only one district in its entirety (Yau Tsim Mong) and portions of two other districts (southwestern part of Kowloon City, Stonecutters Island of Sham Shui Po).
 Sai Kung Peninsula
 Pak Sha Wan Peninsula
 Sha Tau Kok Peninsula
 Wan Tsai Peninsula

Hong Kong Island
 Cape D'Aguilar – Southern District
 – Southern District
 Red Hill Peninsula
 Stanley – Southern District

Lantau Island
 Chi Ma Wan Peninsula – Islands District
 Fan Lau

Former peninsulas
 Tai Kok Tsui – Yau Tsim Mong District, can hardly be identified on maps now, due to land reclamation.
 Texaco Peninsula – Kwai Tsing District

Islands
Below is a partial list of the islands of Hong Kong and the districts they belong to:

 A Chau (Centre Island) – Tai Po
 A Chau – North
 Adamasta Rock – Islands
 Ap Chau Mei Pak Tun Pai – North
 Ap Chau Pak Tun Pai – North
 Ap Chau (Robinson Island) – North
 Ap Lei Chau (Aberdeen Island) – Southern
 Ap Lei Pai – Southern
 Ap Lo Chun – North
 Ap Tan Pai – North
 Ap Tau Pai – North
 Bay Islet (See Chau) – Sai Kung
 Breaker Reef – Tai Po
 Bun Bei Chau – Sai Kung
 Bun Sha Pai – Tai Po
 Cha Kwo Chau – Islands
 Cha Yue Pai – Sai Kung
 Cham Pai – Tai Po
 Cham Pai – Sai Kung
 Cham Tau Chau – Sai Kung
 Chap Mo Chau – North
 Chau Tsai Kok – Tai Po
 Chau Tsai – Sai Kung
 Che Lei Pai – Tai Po
 Chek Chau (Port Island) – Tai Po
 Chek Lap Kok – Islands – now assimilated with Lam Chau into the airport platform and connected to Lantau Island by two bridges
 Cheung Chau – Islands
 Cheung Shek Tsui – North
 Cheung Sok – Tsuen Wan
 Cheung Tsui Chau – Sai Kung
 Ching Chau (distinct from Steep Island) – Sai Kung
 Conic Island – Sai Kung
 Douglas Rock – Islands
 Flat Island (Ngan Chau) – Tai Po
 Fo Shek Chau (Basalt Island) – Sai Kung
 Fo Siu Pai – Sai Kung
 Fu Wong Chau – North
 Fun Chau – North
 Green Island – Central & Western
 Ha So Pai – Islands
 Hau Tsz Kok Pai – Tai Po
 Hei Ling Chau – Islands
 Hin Pai – Tai Po
 Hok Tsai Pai – Sai Kung
 Hong Kong Island
 Hung Pai – North
 Kai Chau – Sai Kung
 Kat O (Crooked Island) – North
 Kau Pei Chau – Southern
 Kau Sai Chau – Sai Kung
 Kau Yi Chau – Islands
 Kiu Tau – Sai Kung
 Kiu Tsui Chau (Sharp Island) – Sai Kung
 Ko Pai – North
 Kok Tai Pai – North
 Kong Tau Pai – Sai Kung
 Kowloon Rock – Kowloon City
 Kung Chau – Tai Po
 Kwun Cham Wan – Sai Kung
 Kwun Tsai – Sai Kung
 Lak Lei Tsai – Sai Kung
 Lamma Island – Islands
 Lan Shuen Pei – North
 Lan Tau Pai – Sai Kung
 Lantau Island – Islands
 Lap Sap Chau – Sai Kung
 Little Green Island – Central & Western
 Lo Chau – Southern
 Lo Chi Pai – North
 Lo Chi Pai – Sai Kung
 Lo Fu Tiu Pai – Sai Kung
 Lo Shue Pai – Eastern
 Loaf Rock – Islands
 Luk Chau, formerly George I. – Islands
 Lung Kwu Chau – Tuen Mun
 Lung Shan Pai – Southern
 Lung Shuen Pai – Sai Kung
 Lut Chau – Yuen Long
 Ma Shi Chau – Tai Po
 Ma Tsai Pai – Sai Kung
 Ma Wan – Tsuen Wan
 Ma Yan Pai – Tai Po
 Magazine Island (Fo Yeuk Chau) – Southern
 Mei Pai – Islands
 Middle Island – Southern
 Mong Chau Tsai – Sai Kung
 Moon Island (Mo Chau) – Tai Po
 Muk Yue Chau – Sai Kung
 Nam Fung Chau – Sai Kung
 Ng Fan Chau – Southern
 Nga Ying Chau – Sai Kung Southeast to Ching Chau 
 Nga Ying Pai – Sai Kung
 Ngam Hau Shek – Tsuen Wan
Ngan Chau – Islands
 Ngau Shi Pui – Sai Kung
 Ngau Tau Pai – Sai Kung
 Ngo Mei Chau (Crescent Island) – North
 Ninepin Group – Sai Kung
 Lung Shuen Pai
 North Ninepin Island
 Sai Chau Mei
 Shue Long Chau
 Tai Chau
 Tai Chau Mei
 Tuen Chau Chai
 Pak Chau – Tuen Mun
 Pak Ka Chau – North
 Pak Ma Tsui Pai – Sai Kung
 Pak Pai – Sai Kung
 Pak Sha Chau (Round Island) – North
 Pak Sha Chau (White Sand Island) – Sai Kung
 Pat Ka Chau – North
 Peaked Hill – Islands
 Peng Chau – Islands
 Pearl Island – Tuen Mun
 Pin Chau – Sai Kung
 Ping Chau – Tai Po
 Ping Min Chau – Sai Kung
 Po Pin Chau – Sai Kung
 Po Toi Islands – Islands
 Castle Rock
 Beaufort Island (Lo Chau)
 Mat Chau, an islet off Po Toi Island
 Mat Chau Pai, an islet off Mat Chau
 Po Toi Island
 Sai Pai
 San Pai
 Sung Kong
 Tai Pai
 Waglan Island
 Po Yue Pai – Sai Kung
 Pun Shan Shek – Tsuen Wan
 Pyramid Rock – Sai Kung
 Round Island – Southern
 Sai Ap Chau – North
 Sam Pai – Sai Kung
 Sam Pui Chau – Tai Po
 Sha Chau – Tuen Mun
 Sha Pai – North
 Sha Pai – Tai Po
 Sha Tong Hau (Bluff Island) – Sai Kung
 Sham Shui Pai – Islands
 Shau Kei Pai – North
 Shek Chau – Sai Kung
 Shek Kwu Chau – Islands
 Shek Ngau Chau – Tai Po
 Shelter Island – Sai Kung
 Sheung Pai – North
 Shui Cham Tsui Pai – North
 Shui Pai – Islands
 Siu Kau Yi Chau – Islands
 Siu Nim Chau – North
 Siu Tsan Chau – Sai Kung
 Soko Islands – Islands
 Cheung Muk Tau
 Ko Pai
 Lung Shuen Pai
 Ma Chau
 Shek Chau
 Siu A Chau
 Tai A Chau
 Tau Lo Chau
 Wan Hau Chau
 Yuen Chau
 Yuen Kong Chau
 Steep Island (Ching Chau) – Sai Kung
 Sunshine Island – Islands
 Ta Ho Pai – North
 Tai Chau – Sai Kung
 Tai Lei – Islands
 Tai Nim Chau – North
 Tai O – Islands
 Tai Pai – Sai Kung
 Tai Tau Chau (Sai Kung District) – Sai Kung
 Tai Tau Chau (Southern District) – Southern
 Tai Tsan Chau – Sai Kung
 Tang Chau – Tai Po
 Tang Lung Chau – Tsuen Wan
 Tap Mun Chau (Grass Island) – Tai Po
 Tau Chau – Southern
 The Brothers – Tuen Mun
 Siu Mo To
 Tai Mo To
 Tsz Kan Chau
 Tit Cham Chau – Sai Kung
 Tit Shue Pai – Tai Po
 Tiu Chung Chau (Jin Island) – Sai Kung
 Tiu Chung Pai – Sai Kung
 Tong Hau Pai – Sai Kung
 Town Island – Sai Kung
 Trio Island – Sai Kung
 Tsim Chau Group – Sai Kung
 Tai Chau
 Tsim Chau
 Tsing Chau (Table Island) – North
 Tsing Yi Island – Kwai Tsing
 Tsui Pai – Islands
 Tuen Tau Chau – Sai Kung
 Tung Lung Chau – Sai Kung
 Tung Sam Chau – Sai Kung
 Wai Chau Pai – Tai Po
 Wai Kap Pai – Sai Kung
 Wang Chau – Sai Kung
 Wang Pai – Sai Kung
 Wo Sheung Chau – Sai Kung
 Wong Mau Chau – Sai Kung
 Wong Nai Chau Tsai – Sai Kung
 Wong Nai Chau – North
 Wong Nai Chau – North
 Wong Nai Chau – Sai Kung
 Wong Wan Chau (Double Island) – North
 Wong Wan Pai – Sai Kung
 Wong Yi Chau – Sai Kung
 Wu Chau – North
 Wu Chau – Tai Po
 Wu Pai – North
 Wu Yeung Chau Pai – North
 Wu Ying Pai – Islands
 Yan Chau – North
 Yau Lung Kok – Sai Kung
 Yeung Chau – North
 Yeung Chau – Tai Po
 Yeung Chau, Sheep Island – Sai Kung
 Yi Long Pai – Islands
 Yi Pai – Sai Kung
 Yim Tin Tsai – Tai Po
 Yim Tin Tsai (Little Salt Field) – Sai Kung
 Yuen Kong Chau – Sai Kung

Former islands 
 Channel Rock – Kowloon City – now a part of the Kai Tak former airport runway
 Chau Tsai – absorbed by reclaimed land of Tsing Yi Island, near CRC Oil Depot of Nam Wan Kok
 Fat Tong Chau (Junk Island) – now a part of Tseung Kwan O, Sai Kung as a result of land reclamation
 Hoi Sham Island – Kowloon City (also To Kwa Wan Island) – now part of To Kwa Wan as a result of reclamation
 Kellett Island – now part of Causeway Bay as a result of gradual land reclamation, Eastern
 La Ka Chau
 Lam Chau – Islands – now assimilated with Chek Lap Kok into the airport platform and connected to Lantau by two bridges
 
 Leung Shuen Wan (High Island), Sai Kung – connected to the mainland to form the High Island Reservoir
 Mong Chau – an island off the hill of Lai King, buried under the Terminal 2 of the Container Terminal
 Mouse Island – an island in Sam Shing, Tuen Mun and now a part of Mouse Island Children's Playground
 Nga Ying Chau – now northeast corner of the Tsing Yi Island as a result of land reclamation
 Rumsey Rock – now a part of shore of between Tsim Sha Tsui East and Hung Hom
 Stonecutters Island – a former island, now part of the Kowloon Peninsula, following land reclamation
 Tsing Chau, or Pillar Island – absorbed into reclaimed land of Gin Drinkers Bay or Lap Sap Wan. It is the Kwai Chung end of Tsing Yi Bridge
 Tung Tau Chau – connected to the mainland to form the Plover Cove Reservoir
 Yuen Chau Tsai
 Un Chau
 Careening Island
 New Wing of Hong Kong Convention and Exhibition Centre

Largest islands

The following is a list of the largest islands of Hong Kong, sorted by area (km2):

 Lantau Island 147.16
 Hong Kong Island 78.52
 Lamma Island 13.74
 Chek Lap Kok – the site of the airport platform, 12.70 km2
 Tsing Yi Island 10.69
 Kau Sai Chau 6.70
 Po Toi 3.69
 Cheung Chau 2.44
 Tung Lung Chau 2.42
 Crooked Island (Kat O) 2.35
 Wong Wan Chau (Double Island) 2.13
 Hei Ling Chau 1.93
 Tap Mun Chau (Grass Island) 1.69
 An artificial island for the Boundary Crossing Facilities and the southern entrance of the Tuen Mun–Chek Lap Kok Link Tunnel 1.50
 Ap Lei Chau 1.30
 Tai A Chau 1.20
 Tung Ping Chau 1.16
 Peng Chau 0.97
 Ma Wan 0.97

Leung Shuen Wan was connected to the mainland in the 1970s to form the High Island Reservoir. It historically had an area of 8.511 km2 and was in 1960 the 4th largest island of Hong Kong. At that time, the airport platform had not yet been built and the area of Tsing Yi increased later as a consequence of land reclamation.

The original Chek Lap Kok had an area of 3.02 km2 (other sources mention 2.8 km2). By the time when the airport was open the size of the island was cited to be 1,248 hectares.

Islands by population
 Hong Kong Island
 Tsing Yi
 Lantau
 Ap Lei Chau
 Cheung Chau
 Ma Wan
 Lamma
 Peng Chau
 Pearl Island
 Grass Island
 Crooked Island

See also

 Geography of Hong Kong
 List of artificial islands of Hong Kong
 List of islands and peninsula of Macau
 List of islands of Asia
 List of islands of China
 List of islands in the Pacific Ocean
 List of islands in the South China Sea
 List of islands of Taiwan
 List of places in Hong Kong
 Transport in Hong Kong – for details about the ferry services between the islands and the rest of the territory
 Wanshan Archipelago – a series of islands south of Hong Kong

References

External links

 Islands District Council website
 Former islands

 
 
 
Hong Kong
Islands
Hong Kong
South China